Boychuk or Boichuk is a Ukrainian surname.

People with the surname include:
 Alexander Boichuk (born 1950), Ukrainian mathematician
 Andy Boychuk (born 1941), Canadian long-distance runner
 Bohdan Boychuk (born 1996), Ukrainian footballer
 Ihor Boychuk (born 1994), Ukrainian footballer
 Johnny Boychuk (born 1984), Canadian hockey player
 Lucas Boychuk (born 1986), Canadian International Hotelier
 Maksim Boychuk (born 1997), Russian footballer 
 Mykhailo Boychuk (1882–1937), Ukrainian painter, founder of Boychukism
 Rick Boychuk (born ), Canadian labour leader and politician
 Taras Boychuk (born 1966), Ukrainian chronobiologist
 Tymofiy Boychuk (1897–1922), Ukrainian painter
 Zach Boychuk (born 1989), Canadian hockey player

See also
 

Ukrainian-language surnames